Brigadier Lorne MacLaine Campbell,  (22 July 1902 – 25 May 1991) was a British Army officer and a Scottish recipient of the Victoria Cross, the highest award for gallantry in the face of the enemy that can be awarded to British and Commonwealth forces.

Early life
Lorne MacLaine Campbell was born on 22 July 1902 in Airds, Argyll, Scotland, the eldest of three sons of Colonel Ian Maxwell Campbell and Hilda Mary Wade. He was schooled at the Dulwich College Preparatory School, and then at Dulwich College in South London between 1915 and 1921 (as was his uncle and fellow recipient of the Victoria Cross, Vice Admiral Gordon Campbell). Between 1921 and 1925, he attended Merton College, Oxford, where he was President of the Junior Common Room and of the Myrmidon Club and graduated with a second class degree in Literae Humaniores, after which he joined the family wine shipping company.

Military service
Campbell was commissioned as a second lieutenant into the 8th battalion Argyll and Sutherland Highlanders (Territorial Army) on 23 September 1921, then under the command of his father. By 1939, Campbell was a major and second-in-command of the battalion.

Second World War
In August 1939, shortly before the outbreak of the Second World War, Campbell's unit, the 8th (Argyllshire) Battalion, Argyll and Sutherland Highlanders was mobilised for war service. Serving as part of the 154th Infantry Brigade, which also included the 7th Battalion, Argylls and the 6th Battalion, Black Watch, of Major General Victor Fortune's 51st (Highland) Infantry Division, the battalion underwent months of training before departing for France as part of the British Expeditionary Force (BEF) in January 1940. During the Battle of France in May–June 1940 Campbell was awarded the Distinguished Service Order (DSO) for gallant leadership during the 51st Division's withdrawal to the coast when, although most of the division was captured at Saint-Valery-en-Caux, Campbell and most of the 154th Brigade managed to reach Le Havre and were evacuated.

After returning the battalion, which had suffered very heavy losses, was reformed with large numbers of reinforcements. In 1942 he became Commanding Officer of the 7th Battalion, Argylls (although it was then designated as the 7th/10th Battalion), still serving as part of the 154th Brigade in the 51st (Highland) Division, reformed in August 1940 by the redesignation of the 9th (Highland) Infantry Division, and led the battalion overseas to North Africa in August 1942. At the Second Battle of El Alamein in late 1942, Campbell received a Bar to his DSO for his part in the capture of important objectives. He led the battalion, after El Alamein, throughout the Tunisian campaign, at El Agheila, in the capture of the Libyan port of Tripoli, Medenine, and Wadi Akarit, where he gained his Victoria Cross. On 28 April, shortly before the campaign came to an end, Campbell became acting commander of the 153rd Brigade.

On 20 May Campbell was promoted to the acting rank of brigadier and took command of the 13th Infantry Brigade, part of the 5th Infantry Division. The brigade, a Regular Army formation, was then serving in Syria, later moving to Egypt, before taking part in the Allied invasion of Sicily, from July until mid-August. After a brief rest, the division, participated in the Allied invasion of Italy, Campbell leading the brigade throughout the 5th Division's involvement in the Italian campaign, seeing service during the Moro River Campaign, the Battle of Monte Cassino, and the Battle of Anzio, before leaving Italy in early July 1944 to return to Egypt, later Palestine, to rest and refit. For eight days in April, he was acting General Officer Commanding of the 5th Division, when the division was in the Anzio beachhead, in place of Major General Philip Gregson-Ellis. Relinquishing command of the brigade in September, Campbell ended the war in the United States, in Washington D.C. as a brigadier with the British Army Staff.

Victoria Cross
Campbell was a 40 years old temporary lieutenant colonel in the 7th Battalion, Argyll and Sutherland Highlanders (Princess Louise's), British Army, during the Second World War at Wadi Akarit in Tunisia. The citation in the London Gazette read:

Personal life

In December 1935 Campbell married Amy Muriel Jordan. The couple had two sons, Alastair Lorne Campbell of Airds (b. 1937) and Patrick Gordon Campbell (b. 1939).

Following demobilisation, Campbell returned to the wine trade, became a liveryman of the Vintners' Company, and was made an Officer of the Order of the British Empire (OBE) in 1968.

Campbell died at the Royal Victoria Hospital, Edinburgh on 25 May 1991, aged 88, and is buried in Warriston Cemetery in Edinburgh in the upper northern section. His medals are on display at the Argyll and Sutherland Highlanders Museum in Stirling Castle.

References

Bibliography

External links
 British Army Officers 1939−1945
Location of grave and VC medal (Edinburgh)
 Generals of World War II

1902 births
1991 deaths
People educated at Dulwich College
Alumni of Merton College, Oxford
Argyll and Sutherland Highlanders officers
British World War II recipients of the Victoria Cross
Officers of the Order of the British Empire
Companions of the Distinguished Service Order
Officers of the Legion of Merit
Lorne MacLaine Campbell
People from Argyll and Bute
Burials at Warriston Cemetery
British Army recipients of the Victoria Cross
British Army brigadiers of World War II
Scottish military personnel